Legacy of Wolves is a fantasy novel by Marsheila Rockwell, set in the world of Eberron, and based on the Dungeons & Dragons role-playing game. It is the third novel in "The Inquisitives" series. It was published in paperback in June 2007.

Plot summary
A string of grisly murders takes place in the city of Aruldusk, which Zoden the bard, Irulan Silverclaw the shifter, Andri Aeyliros the paladin and Greddark d'Kundarak the dwarf try to solve.

Reception
Pat Ferrara of mania.com comments that the book "is a well-crafted story that, for all of its depth, feels like a  slice out of a world that has a lot more is going on in it. Legacy of Wolves stands head and shoulders above the other installments in the Inquisitives series and makes you hope Wizards gives Marcy a bigger bite of Eberron to chew on in her next novels."

References

2007 American novels

Eberron novels